Jared Christopher Mitchell (born October 13, 1988) is an American professional baseball outfielder who is a free agent. He was drafted by the Chicago White Sox in the first round of the 2009 Major League Baseball draft. He played college baseball at LSU, where he was the College World Series Most Outstanding Player in 2009.

Amateur career
Mitchell attended Westgate High School, where Baseball America picked him as the third-best high school athlete and 43rd-best overall high school baseball prospect in the nation for 2006.

Mitchell turned down a $700,000 signing bonus from the Minnesota Twins in order to attend Louisiana State University (LSU) after being selected by the club in the 10th round of the 2006 Major League Baseball Draft.

Mitchell played for both the LSU Tigers baseball team and the LSU Tigers football team. He was awarded the College World Series Most Outstanding Player for his play during the 2009 College World Series which was won by the LSU Tigers. He also played on the 2007 LSU BCS National Championship football team as a wide receiver. He is a rare two-sport college national champion along with LSU baseball and football teammate Chad Jones. In 2008, he played collegiate summer baseball with the Yarmouth–Dennis Red Sox of the Cape Cod Baseball League.

Professional career

Chicago White Sox
Mitchell was drafted in the first round ( overall) of the 2009 Major League Baseball Draft by the Chicago White Sox. White Sox scouting director Doug Laumann was familiar with Mitchell because he played the previous two summers in an amateur league near Laumann's Cincinnati-area residence. He began his professional career with the Kannapolis Intimidators, the Class A affiliate of the White Sox. He finished the season with a .296 batting average, 12 doubles, two triples, no home runs, 10 runs batted in, 5 stolen bases, 23 walks, and 40 strikeouts in 115 at bats.

On March 16, 2010, Mitchell underwent surgery to repair a tear of the tendon in his left ankle; he missed the entire season. He returned to play in 2011 in Class A-Advanced ball for the Winston-Salem Dash in North Carolina. He finished the 2011 season batting .222 AVG, 31 2Bs, 8 3Bs, 9 HRs, 58 RBI, 14 SBs, 52 BBs and 183 Ks in 477 at bats. In 2012, Mitchell moved up to the Birmingham Barons of the Class AA Southern League. Later in the 2012 season, Mitchell was promoted to Charlotte Knights of the Class AAA International League. Mitchell finished the 2012 season hitting a combined .237 AVG, 24 2Bs, 13 3Bs, 11 HRs, 67 RBI, 21 SBs, 78 BBs and 179 Ks in 455 at bats. Mitchell started the 2013 season with Triple-A Charlotte but after hitting .132 AVG in his first 53 at bats, he was demoted back to Double-A Birmingham. He finished the 2013 season between AAA and AA batting .167 AVG, 8 2Bs, 2 3Bs, 5 HRs, 23 RBI, 17 SBs, 51 BBs and 123 Ks in 300 at bats. Despite the poor season, Mitchell started the 2014 season at Triple-A Charlotte, but was demoted to Birmingham, and was added to the White Sox 40-man roster after the season. On May 3, 2015, Mitchell was released by the White Sox.

Los Angeles Angels
Mitchell signed a minor league deal with the Los Angeles Angels of Anaheim on May 16, 2015. After signing with the Angels, Mitchell played for the Arkansas Travelers of the Class AA Texas League and Salt Lake Bees of the Class AAA Pacific Coast League during the 2015 season. On November 7, 2015, Mitchell elected free agency.

New York Yankees
The New York Yankees signed Mitchell to a minor league contract on February 4, 2016. Mitchell was assigned to the Trenton Thunder of the Class AA Eastern League. After his walk off homer against the Richmond Flying Squirrels on May 17, 2016, Mitchell was released by Trenton.

York Revolution
On July 2, 2016, he signed with the York Revolution. During the 2017 season, Mitchell helped lead the team to a championship victory, clocking 122 games with a .295 average and .380 OBP. He slugged .489 with an .869 OPS, as he hit 34 doubles, 3 triples, and 14 homeruns, swiped 24 bases and walked 55 times. He averaged one strike out per game, a considerable improvement from previous years.

Cincinnati Reds
On December 6, 2017, Mitchell signed a minor league contract with the Cincinnati Reds. Mitchell's release on March 22, 2018 came as a surprise to everyone, as he was hitting for an average of .360 with 2 homeruns, 2 doubles, 3 walks, 4 rbi, and 2/2 stolen bases with only 5 Ks in 25 at bats during Spring Training on the Reds’ Triple A team.

Return to York Revolution
On April 11, 2018, Mitchell signed with the York Revolution of the Atlantic League of Professional Baseball. He became a free agent following the 2018 season.

Sugar Land Skeeters
On April 15, 2019, Mitchell signed with the Sugar Land Skeeters of the Atlantic League of Professional Baseball. He was released on July 16, 2019.

High Point Rockers
On July 31, 2019, Mitchell signed with the High Point Rockers of the Atlantic League of Professional Baseball. He became a free agent following the season. On April 8, 2020, Mitchell re-signed with the Rockers for the 2020 season, but didn't appear in any games as the season was canceled due to the COVID-19 pandemic.

Eastern Reyes del Tigre
In July 2020, Mitchell signed on to play for the Eastern Reyes del Tigre of the Constellation Energy League (a makeshift 4-team independent league created as a result of the COVID-19 pandemic) for the 2020 season.

High Point Rockers (second stint)
On May 11, 2021, Mitchell signed with the High Point Rockers of the Atlantic League of Professional Baseball. He became a free agent following the season. 

On April 21, 2022, Mitchell re-signed with the Rockers for the 2022 season. Mitchell appeared in only one game for High Point, going 0-for-3 with a walk, before he was released on April 28.

Awards
2008 NCAA Regional All-Tournament Team
2008 Second-Team All-Louisiana
SEC Freshman of the Week (Feb. 26, 2007)
2009 College World Series Most Outstanding Player

References

External links

1988 births
Living people
African-American baseball players
People from New Iberia, Louisiana
Baseball players from Louisiana
Baseball outfielders
LSU Tigers baseball players
Yarmouth–Dennis Red Sox players
College World Series Most Outstanding Player Award winners
LSU Tigers football players
Kannapolis Intimidators players
Winston-Salem Dash players
Birmingham Barons players
Peoria Saguaros players
Charlotte Knights players
Glendale Desert Dogs players
Arkansas Travelers players
Salt Lake Bees players
Trenton Thunder players
New Jersey Jackals players
York Revolution players
Sugar Land Skeeters players
High Point Rockers players
21st-century African-American sportspeople
20th-century African-American people